Ernest Angély Séraphin Nègre (born 11 October 1907 in Saint-Julien-Gaulène (Tarn), died 15 April 2000 in Toulouse) was a French toponymist.

Works 
 Ernest Nègre, Toponymie générale de la France (Etymology of 35,000 place names). 2. Formations non-romanes ..., Volume 2, Librairie Droz, Genève 1991. p. 1012 / 18239

French topographers
Toponymists
1907 births
2000 deaths
20th-century cartographers